Deraya Air Taxi is an airline based in Jakarta, Indonesia. It operates commuter, charter, medical evacuation, and aerial photography services, as well as a flying school. Its main base is Halim Perdanakusuma International Airport, Jakarta, with a hub at Husein Sastranegara International Airport, Bandung. Deraya Air Taxi is listed in category 2 by Indonesian Civil Aviation Authority for airline safety quality.

History 

The airline was established in March 1967 and started operations in 1967. It is wholly owned by the Boedihardjo Group. In January 2005 Deraya Air Taxi had its first Shorts 360 aircraft delivered.

Destinations 

Deraya Air Taxi operates the following services (at 2006):

Java
Bandung – Husein Sastranegara International Airport Hub
Jakarta – Halim Perdanakusuma International Airport Main Base
Semarang – Achmad Yani International Airport
Kalimantan
Palangkaraya – Tjilik Riwut Airport
Pangkalanbun – Iskandar Airport
Papua and Maluku
Ambon – Pattimura Airport
Babo – Babo Airport
Bula, Papua – Bula Airport
Kaimana – Kaimana Airport
Sorong – Sorong Airport
Sumatra
Batam – Hang Nadim Airport
Lubuklinggau – Lubuklinggau Airport
Matak – Matak Airport
Palembang – Sultan Mahmud Badaruddin II Airport
Pangkal Pinang – Pangkal Pinang Airport
 - Seletar Airport

Fleet

Current 
The Deraya Air Taxi fleet includes the following aircraft (as of November 2021):
1 Boeing 737-300

Former 

2 British Aerospace ATPF
2 Indonesian Aerospace 212-100
2 Shorts 330-100
2 Shorts 360-300

Accidents and Incidents 
 On November 1982, Indonesian Aerospace 212-100 PK-DCR of Deraya Air Taxi and PT Pupuk Kaltim was damaged when it approaching Bontang. No fatalities in this accident.

References

External links 
 

Airlines of Indonesia
Airlines established in 1967
Indonesian companies established in 1967